Sandra Glover (née Cummings; born December 30, 1968, in Palestine, Texas) is an American former track and field athlete who competed in the 400-meter hurdles. She was a medalist in that event at the World Championships in Athletics in 2003 (silver) and 2005 (bronze). She also represented her country at the 2000 Summer Olympics. She was the national champion at the USA Outdoor Track and Field Championships for four consecutive years from 1999 to 2002. She had five victories on the IAAF Golden League circuit during her career.

She holds the American masters record for the over-35 category, with her performance of 53.32 seconds at the 2005 World Championships in Athletics.

Glover attended the University of Houston and competed for the Houston Cougars track team.

Achievements 
 2005 World Championships in Athletics: bronze medal
 2003 World Championships in Athletics: silver medal
 2001 World Championships in Athletics: fifth place
 1999 World Championships in Athletics: fifth place
 2nd IAAF World Athletics Final: first place
 1st IAAF World Athletics Final: first place

National titles
USA Outdoor Track and Field Championships
400 m hurdles: 1999, 2000, 2001, 2002

Circuit wins
400 m hurdles
IAAF Golden League
Meeting de Paris: 2003
Weltklasse Zürich: 2003, 2004
Bislett Games: 2005
ISTAF Berlin: 2005

See also
400 metres hurdles at the World Championships in Athletics
List of University of Houston people
List of people named Sandra

References

External links

1968 births
Living people
People from Palestine, Texas
Track and field athletes from Texas
American female hurdlers
Olympic female hurdlers
Olympic track and field athletes of the United States
Athletes (track and field) at the 2000 Summer Olympics
World Athletics Championships medalists
World Athletics Championships athletes for the United States
African-American female track and field athletes
Houston Cougars women's track and field athletes
21st-century African-American people
21st-century African-American women
20th-century African-American sportspeople
20th-century African-American women
20th-century African-American people